Manjeshwar Ganapathi Rao Aigal (1881–1944) was a historian and served as a teacher in Bantwal, Dakshina Kannada. He was the author of Dakshina Kannada Jilleya Prachina Itihasa (Ancient History of Dakshina Kannada), published in 1923.

Works 
 Sthala Puranagalu Series (Mangalore, Kollur, Polali, Kumbale, Subramanya, Dharmasthala, Udyavara) Not available.
 Sthala Puranagalu Series - Manjeshwara
 Shri Kashimathada Charithre

Documentation of Paād-danāas
Paād-danāas are songs or ballads rendered in Tulu language, describing the origin and the deeds of the legends in the rituals of Bhuta Kola.
 Attavara Daivongulu (1928)
 Tulu Paddanolu (1933) (Todakinar, Mandattaye, Bobbarya, Kallurti, Kalkuda)
 Bobbarya 
 Mundatthaye

References

1944 deaths
1881 births
Educators from Karnataka
20th-century Indian historians
People from Dakshina Kannada district